Tropical Storm Dolores was a strong tropical storm that affected several states in southwestern Mexico in June 2021. The fourth named storm of the 2021 Pacific hurricane season, Dolores developed from a low-pressure area that formed offshore the state of Oaxaca on June 16, 2021. The area steadily developed deep convection and a closed surface circulation, becoming Tropical Depression Four-E around 09:00 UTC on June 18. The depression quickly strengthened to Tropical Storm Dolores six hours later. As it gradually approached the coast, Dolores steadily intensified despite its proximity to land. Shortly afterward, Dolores made landfall just northwest of Punta San Telmo, Mexico, near the Colima-Michoacán state border. The storm rapidly weakened as it moved inland and dissipated early on June 20 over Zacatecas. However, the storm's mid-level circulation continued northward, before it dissipated later that day.

The precursor disturbance to Dolores and the Atlantic's Tropical Storm Claudette caused days of heavy rainfall across southeastern Mexico and Central America. Tropical storm watches and warnings and a hurricane watch were issued along the southwestern coast of Mexico shortly after Dolores' upgrade to a tropical storm, from Nayarit to Michoacán. At least three people died in Mexico, two of the deaths occurring within Guerrero and another in Jalisco.

Meteorological history

On June 15, the United States' National Hurricane Center (NHC) noted the potential development of an area of low-pressure offshore the coast of southwest Mexico. The following day, a broad area of low pressure developed as predicted, and started to produce a wide area of disorganized showers and thunderstorms. The disturbance organized little until early on June 18, when convection surrounding the storm's center became more well-organized. Simultaneously, the closed surface-circulation developed, signaling the development of a tropical depression at 09:00 UTC that day. Expanding deep convection over the center of the depression, as well as increasing Dvorak classifications, resulted in its upgrade to a tropical storm at 15:00 UTC, where upon it was named Dolores.

A broad and sprawling tropical storm, Dolores gradually intensified due to favorable conditions for the remainder of the day. The cyclone also underwent a general north-northwestward motion as it rounded the side of mid-level ridge. Deep convection began to develop in more organized and large bands over Dolores's circulation around 09:00 UTC on June 19, and increased in coverage near its center. The storm continued to become more organized as it neared the coastline of southwest Mexico, with an defined eye and almost closed eyewall. Dolores made landfall just after reaching peak intensity near the border of the Mexican states of Colima and Michoacán, slightly northwest of the town of Punta San Telmo in the latter state. Dolores rapidly weakened over western Mexico, due to the mountainous terrain of the area. The cyclone was downgraded to a tropical depression at 03:00 UTC on June 20. Shortly afterward, Dolores's surface circulation dissipated over southwestern Zacatecas. However, its mid-level circulation and its associated moisture and shower activity continued northward over Mexico before dissipating later that day.

Preparations and impact
Torrential rainfall and flash flooding lashed southern portions of the state during Dolores's passage to the south and east. The Mexican Secretary of National Defense, Luis Cresencio Sandoval, activated the Plan DN-III-E following Dolores's landfall, which allowed for the dispatch of 2,302 military units to assist in relief efforts in Colima, Guerrero, and Michoacán. Additionally, 190 shelters, 10 shelters, and 8 community kitchens were opened in these states.

Insured losses across Mexico were estimated at US$50 million.

Guerrero and Oaxaca

The precursor to Dolores, in sync with the precursor of Tropical Storm Claudette over the Bay of Campeche, caused days of heavy rainfall across southern Mexico and Central America. Residents of several states in southwestern Mexico were advised of accompanying tropical-storm-force winds, power outages, landslides, overflowing rivers, and widespread punctual rains as Dolores approached. Torrential rains lashed the coasts of Oaxaca, Guerrero, and Michoacán as the cyclone approached the coast.  35 houses in Guerrero were damaged by landslides caused by the precursor disturbance of Dolores. However, the disturbance's rainfall also brought relief to the widespread drought which was impacting Guerrero and helped the agricultural sector.

In neighboring Oaxaca, at least ten Zapotec communities were impacted by overflowing streams and rivers and damage to agriculture and infrastructure due to Dolores's and Claudette's precursors. The worst damage in the state was in the Sierra Sur and Costa regions, where mudslides made roads unpassable. Two people died in San Nicolás after being struck by lightning.

Michoacán and Colima

Upon landfall near the Michoacán and Colima state border, the Colima State Civil Protection Unit noted there was only minor damage to infrastructure  in coastal areas. However, at least 232 fallen trees were reported throughout the state while around 400 mm (15.75 in) of rain fell near Tecomán, the resulting floods damaging banana crops and threatening agriculture. More than 150 people rode out the storm at an evacuation center at a school in Cerra de Ortega, Tecomán. At least two houses were seriously damaged by flooding. 60% of banana crops in Colima were wiped out by floods produced by the tropical storm, causing the price of bananas to rise in the state. In neighboring Michoacán, at least 20 municipalities were affected by Dolores after consistent rainfall for 30 hours caused flooding and winds uprooted trees. Heavy rain caused floods and landslides blocked roads in Lázaro Cárdenas, Uruapan, Aquila, Chinicuila. Apatzingán, Morelia, and Arteaga. A stream overflowed and caused flooding in Villa Victoria, Chinicuila. The highway to Zihuatanejo was closed due to flooding. Damage in Michoacán was considered minimal.

Elsewhere
In Jalisco, at least 80 houses or 300 people living in El Rebalse were isolated in floods after the Marabasco River overflowed. The Federal Electricity Commission (CFE) reported 54,399 customers lost electricity across Jalisco, Nayarit, and Sinaloa due to Dolores. A man died at a soccer field in Ciudad Guzmán, Jalisco, after being struck by lightning. The outer bands of Dolores also caused minor flooding in Sinaloa.

See also

Weather of 2021
Tropical cyclones in 2021
List of Eastern Pacific tropical storms
Other storms named Dolores
Hurricane Dolores (1974) – Another June storm that had the same name and also affected land. 
Tropical Storm Narda (2019) – Tropical storm that took a similar path.

Notes

References

External links

 The National Hurricane Center's advisory archive on Tropical Storm Dolores

	

Eastern Pacific tropical storms
2021 Pacific hurricane season
2021 in Mexico
Dolores
Pacific hurricanes in Mexico
June 2021 events